Tell Arpachiyah (outside modern Mosul in Ninawa Governorate Iraq) is a prehistoric archaeological site in Nineveh Province (Iraq). The local name of the mound on which the site is located is Tepe Reshwa.

Tepe Gawra is also a contemporary Neolithic site located in the Mosul region.

History of archaeological research
After being scouted by Reginald Campbell Thompson in 1928, it was excavated by Max Mallowan and John Cruikshank Rose of the British School of Archaeology in Iraq, along with Agatha Christie, in 1933. Additional soundings were conducted in 1976 by a team led by Ismail Hijara. Several Halaf structures were uncovered, including tholoi and the "Burnt House". An array of Halaf pottery and sealings were also found, along with some Ubaid burials.

Tell Arpachiyah and its environment

Occupation history
The site was occupied in the Halaf and Ubaid periods. It appears to have been heavily involved in the manufacture of pottery. The pottery recovered there forms the basis for the internal chronology of the Halaf period.

Gallery

See also

Cities of the ancient Near East
Come, Tell Me How You Live

References

Further reading
Hijara, Ismail. The Halaf Period in Northern Mesopotamia, Nabu, 1997, 
Stuart Campbell, The Burnt House at Arpachiyah: A Reexamination, Bulletin of the American Schools of Oriental Research, no. 318, pp. 1–40, 2000
Peter M. M. G. Akkermans, Glenn M. Schwartz, The Archaeology of Syria: From Complex Hunter-gatherers to Early Urban Societies (c. 16,000-300 BC), Cambridge University Press, 2003, 
T. Davidson and H. McKerrell, The neutron activation analysis of Halaf and Ubaid pottery from Tell Arpachiyah and Tepe Gawra, Iraq, vol. 42, pp. 155–67, 1980

External links
Halaf Bowl from Arpachiyah - British Museum
Snake image on Pottery from Arpachiyah - British Museum
Pre-Historic Tell Arpachiyah --- The History of the Ancient Near East
Excavations in Northern Mesopotamia - Nature volume 131, pages 685–686 (13 May 1933)

Archaeological sites in Iraq
Former populated places in Iraq
Nineveh Governorate
Halaf culture
Ubaid period
1928 archaeological discoveries
Tells (archaeology)